Thomas Pierie (May 12, 1907 – January 26, 1978) was an American rower. He competed in the men's coxless four event at the 1932 Summer Olympics.

References

1907 births
1978 deaths
American male rowers
Olympic rowers of the United States
Rowers at the 1932 Summer Olympics
People from Montgomery County, Pennsylvania